Scoliophthalmus is a genus of flies in the family Chloropidae.

References 

 Fauna Europaea

Chloropidae genera